The 2013 NBA All-Star Game was an exhibition basketball game that was played on February 17, 2013, during the National Basketball Association's (NBA) 2012–13 season. It was the 62nd edition of the NBA All-Star Game, and was played at Toyota Center in Houston, home of the Houston Rockets. The Western Conference defeated the Eastern Conference, 143–138. Chris Paul of the Los Angeles Clippers was named the All-Star Game Most Valuable Player. The Rockets were awarded the All-Star Game in an announcement by commissioner David Stern on February 8, 2012. This was the third time that Houston had hosted the All-Star Game; the city had previously hosted the event in 1989 at the Astrodome and 2006 at the Toyota Center. 

Starters for the game were selected by the fans, who could select three frontcourt players and two guards from each conference. Previously, fans selected two forwards and one center instead of generic frontcourt players. Kobe Bryant of the Los Angeles Lakers received the most overall votes at 1,591,437.

Starting this season, NBA All-Star Saturday Night events became contests between the Eastern and Western Conferences.

All-Star Game

Coaches

The coaches for the All-Star game were the head coaches who led the teams with the best winning percentages in their conference through the games of February 3, 2013. Gregg Popovich of the San Antonio Spurs clinched the West position after a win on January 30. Erik Spoelstra of the Miami Heat clinched the East position after a win over the Toronto Raptors on February 3, 2013. The head coaches from the previous year, Tom Thibodeau and Scott Brooks, were not eligible for selection.

Players
The rosters for the All-Star Game were chosen in two ways. The starters were chosen via a fan ballot. Two guards and three frontcourt players who received the highest vote were named the All-Star starters. NBA head coaches voted for the reserves for their respective conferences, none of which could be players on their own team. Each coach selected two guards, three frontcourt players and two wild cards, with each selected player ranked in order of preference within each category. If a multi-position player was to be selected, coaches were encouraged to vote for the player at the position that was "most advantageous for the All-Star team," regardless of where the player was listed on the All-Star ballot or the position he was listed in box scores. If a player is unable to participate due to injury, the commissioner will select a replacement.

Kobe Bryant of the Los Angeles Lakers topped the ballots with 1,591,437 votes, which earned him a starting position as a guard in the Western Conference team. Bryant earned a record 15th consecutive All-Star selection. Chris Paul, Kevin Durant, Blake Griffin, and Dwight Howard completed the Western Conference starting position. The lone first-time All-Star in the Western Conference is the Houston Rockets' James Harden. All of the players from the West started in last year's All-Star Game, save for Howard who started for the East, and similar to last year, both Los Angeles teams, the Lakers and the Clippers, are represented by two players each, all of whom are starters. Also sending a pair of players to the All-Star Game were the Oklahoma City Thunder, represented by Durant and Russell Westbrook, and the San Antonio Spurs, represented by Tim Duncan and Tony Parker. The Golden State Warriors had an All-Star representative for the first time since Latrell Sprewell was selected in 1997, with David Lee.

The Eastern Conference's leading vote-getter was LeBron James, who finished with 1,583,646 votes. Rajon Rondo, Dwyane Wade, Carmelo Anthony, and Kevin Garnett completed the Eastern Conference starting positions. Anthony, James and Wade were starters for the previous year's Eastern Conference team. The Eastern Conference reserves included six first-time selections:  Tyson Chandler, Paul George, Jrue Holiday, Kyrie Irving, Brook Lopez, and Joakim Noah. The Boston Celtics sent two players to start in the All-Star Game for the first time since 1984, when Larry Bird and Robert Parish started for the East. The New York Knicks sent two players to the All-Star Game for the first time since 2001.

Roster

(C) – Named team captains for All-Star Game by National Basketball Players Association.

 Did not participate due to injury.
 Brook Lopez was named Rajon Rondo's replacement by NBA commissioner David Stern.
 Erik Spoelstra chose Chris Bosh to start in place of the injured Rajon Rondo

Game

The West led at the end of each quarter and won 143–138 behind Chris Paul, who won MVP honors scoring 20 points, handing out 15 assists and grabbing 4 steals. The West never led by more than eight points through the first three quarters, but they pushed the lead to double figures early in the fourth.  Kobe Bryant blocked two shots by LeBron James late in the game, part of a late run to secure the game for the West. Kevin Durant led all scorers with 30 points and became the first player in NBA history to score 30+ points in three consecutive All-Star games, while Bryant had nine points and eight assists. Carmelo Anthony led the East with 26 points and 12 rebounds.  James, who shot well during the latter part of the season's first half, shot only 7-for-18 while scoring 19 points.

All-Star Weekend

BBVA Rising Stars Challenge

 Andre Drummond was unable to participate due to injury.
 Andrew Nicholson was named Andre Drummond's replacement.

Sears Shooting Stars Competition

 Note: 
The sponsor of 2013 Shooting Stars Competition changed from Haier to Sears.
2013 Shooting Stars Competition consisted four teams of three players, East and West represent two (teams) of each.

 All Legends do not specify which teams players represent.

Taco Bell Skill Challenge

 Note: 2013 Skill Challenge had six players as usual, but divided three players of each conference into East and West.

Foot Locker Three-Pointer Contest

 Note: 2013 Three-Point Contest had six players as usual, but divided three players of each conference into East and West.

Sprite Slam Dunk Contest

 Note: 
2013 Slam Dunk Contest increased from four players to six, with three players representing each conference into East and West.
The allowable dunk time was shortened from 2:00 to 1:30, but if the player had not finished a dunk within 1:30, he would be given one final attempt. 
In Team Round (or First Round), each competitor completed two dunks which were scored on a scale of 6 to 10 by a panel of 5 judges. The Championship Round (or Final Round) was a fan voting poll to decide a winner.

Competition score
Starting in 2013, the Western Conference and the Eastern Conference will compete to see who gets the most points. This score will only be applied to All-Star Saturday Night competitions.

 Final Score:
 Eastern: 125
 Western: 140
Structure:
 Team Round = First Round, Championship Round = Final Round.
 Each competition will have two rounds.
 TEAM ROUND—All competitors within each conference will have their scores added together to get a TOTAL time/score.
 Points will be awarded to the conference that wins the Team Round (best TOTAL time/score)
 The highest scoring (or fastest timing) competitor from each conference will advance to the Championship Round.
 CHAMPIONSHIP ROUND—A head-to-head competition between the highest scoring West and highest scoring East competitor from the Team Round, to decide each competition champion.
 Points will be awarded to the conference whose competitor wins the Championship Round.
 The conference with the most points at the end of the night will be crowned State Farm All-Star Saturday Night Champions.
 Event Scoring:
 Sears Shooting Stars:
 TEAM Round—20 POINTS awarded to the conference with the fastest TOTAL time.
 CHAMPIONSHIP Round—10 POINTS awarded to the conference of the champion.
 Taco Bell Skills Challenge:
 TEAM Round—30 POINTS awarded to the conference with the fastest TOTAL time.
 CHAMPIONSHIP Round—10 POINTS awarded to the conference of the champion.
 Foot Locker Three-Point Contest:
 TEAM Round—40 POINTS awarded to the conference with the highest TOTAL score.
 CHAMPIONSHIP Round—10 POINTS awarded to the conference of the champion.
 Sprite Slam Dunk:
 TEAM Round—50 POINTS awarded to the conference with the highest TOTAL score.
 CHAMPIONSHIP Round—55 POINTS awarded to the conference of the champion.
 In addition, each time a player scores a perfect 50 for a dunk during the TEAM Round, his conference will have 10 BONUS POINTS added to its overall All-Star Saturday Night score.

References

External links
 2013 All-Star Game at NBA.com

2013
All-Star Game
NBA All-Star Game
2013 in Houston
Basketball competitions in Houston
February 2013 sports events in the United States
ABS-CBN television specials